The Saint Herman of Alaska Monastery is an Eastern Orthodox monastery located in Platina, California. It is part of the Serbian Orthodox Eparchy of Western America.
The monastery was founded by Seraphim Rose
and Herman Podmoshensky back in 1968 with the blessing of Bishop John Maximovitch of the Diocese of San Francisco and Western America of the Russian Orthodox Church Outside of Russia (ROCOR). The monastery was founded in 1970 and only since 2000, the monastics serve under the omophor of Bishop Maksim Vasiljević of the Serbian Orthodox Eparchy of Western America. The monks there lead ascetic lives.

Saint Herman Monastery is known for its publications in the English language. The brotherhood produces and prints original books; translates major Orthodox works into English; and publishes a bimonthly periodical, The Orthodox Word, and the annual Saint Herman Church Calendar. This is done through the monastery's publishing house, St. Herman Press, located at the St. Xenia Skete in Wildwood, California.

There are four Serbian monasteries affiliated with the St. Herman of Alaska Brotherhood: Monastery of St. Herman of Alaska (Platina, California); Saint Nilus Island Skete (Ouzinkie, Alaska); St. Archangel Michael Skete (Ouzinkie, Alaska); and St. Xenia Serbian Orthodox Skete, (Wildwood, California).

The monastery is frequented by Christians of different ethnic and denominational backgrounds.

See also
 List of Serbian Orthodox monasteries
 List of Eastern Orthodox monasteries in the United States
 Saint Sava Serbian Orthodox Monastery and Seminary
 New Gračanica Monastery
 Monastery of St. Paisius, Safford
 St. Pachomious Monastery
 St. Archangel Michael Skete
 St. Xenia Serbian Orthodox Skete
 St. Nilus Island Skete
 Saint Petka Serbian Orthodox Church
 St. Mark Serbian Orthodox Monastery
 Holy Transfiguration Monastery, located at the Episcopal headquarters of the Serbian Orthodox Eparchy of Canada in Milton, Ontario

References

External links

 

Serbian Orthodox monasteries in the United States
Serbian Orthodox Church in the United States